Sophia Warner (born 23 May 1974) is a Paralympian track and field athlete from England competing mainly in T35 sprint events. In 2012, she qualified for the 2012 Summer Paralympics, selected for the T35 100m and 200m sprint and is also part of the T35-38 women's relay team. In 2012, she became the commercial director of UK Athletics.

Warner was born in Dorking in England in 1974. Warner, who has cerebral palsy, began racing at the age of 19 when she was persuaded by friends to attend a sports training weekend in Sheffield. 
Warner began to take her running seriously while she was studying for her degree in Biomedical Science and Business Studies at Leicester University.

In June 2011 she competed in the IPC Athletics World Championships in Christchurch, New Zealand, winning the silver in the 200m and bronze in 100m sprints. She qualified for the 2012 Summer Paralympics running in the T35 100m and 200m sprint and the T35-38 women's relay team for Great Britain. Warner finished 4th in the T35 200m final, with a personal best time of 35.25. Warner was unable to qualify for earlier Paralympic Games as London 2012 was the first games to include the events in her classification.

In November 2016, Warner launched the Para Triathlon Superhero Series for disabled and non-disabled people to take part in triathlons together.

Warner is an Ambassador of The Children's Trust, the UK's leading charity for children with brain injury and neurodisability. She received specialist treatment as a child at the charity in the 1980s.

References

External links
 
 Official Website

Living people
1974 births
People from Dorking
Cerebral Palsy category Paralympic competitors
English female sprinters
British female sprinters
Sportswomen with disabilities
British disabled sportspeople
English people with disabilities
Paralympic athletes of Great Britain
Athletes (track and field) at the 2012 Summer Paralympics
British sports executives and administrators
Medalists at the World Para Athletics Championships
Medalists at the World Para Athletics European Championships
Paralympic sprinters